Dead air is an unintended interruption in a broadcast during which the carrier signal is unmodulated.

Dead Air may also refer to:
 Dead Air, a 1986 novel by mystery author Mike Lupica
 Dead Air, a 1991 novel by Bob Larson
 Dead Air (novel), a 2002 novel by Iain Banks
 "Dead Air" (Doctor Who), a 2010 exclusive-to-audio Doctor Who story
 Dead Air (Heatmiser album), 1993
 Dead Air (The Bob & Tom Show album), 2009
 Dead Air, a radio show on Indie 103.1 in Los Angeles from 2004 to 2009 hosted by Chuck P. 
 Dead Air (1994 film), a 1994 TV movie starring Gregory Hines
 Dead Air (2007 film), a 2007 Hong Kong supernatural thriller
 Dead Air (2009 film), a 2009 zombie-themed film
 Dead Air (CSI: Miami), an episode in season 4 of CSI: Miami
 "Dead Air", the twelfth episode in season 7 of Psych
 A campaign in the game Left 4 Dead
 "Dead Air", a 2014 song by CHVRCHES

See also
Dead space (disambiguation)